Georgia is an ambiguous place name; see:
 List of mountains in Georgia (U.S. state)
 List of mountains in Georgia (country)